Sacred Steel may refer to: 

  Sacred Steel (band), a German extreme power metal band
  Sacred Steel (musical tradition), a musical tradition within certain African-American Churches